The European Studbook Foundation is an initiative for promoting and maintaining studbooks of reptiles and amphibians in captivity. 

Founded as O.O.S in 1997 in the Netherlands, changed to ESF in 2003.

Aims
Conservation of reptiles and amphibians in captivity, with emphasis on endangered species.
Management of European studbooks.
Management of genetically healthy breeding programmes.
Cooperation with re-introduction programmes.
Gathering, compiling and spreading of knowledge of husbandry and reproduction of reptiles and amphibians.

External links
European Studbook Foundation Official Site

Breed registries